Kwak Jaesik is a South Korean novelist, science fiction writer and chemist. He is best known for stories of ordinary people with plot twists of science fiction or fantasy elements. Some of his work has been adapted to television drama and comics.

Kwak has also written experimental literature including 140 Character Stories (140자 소설) posted on a Twitter account, which was featured on an EBS radio show's introduction.

Bibliography
 I'd Really Like to Marry You (Tangsin kwa kkok kyŏrhon hago sipsŭmnida), Onuju, 2013, 
 The Book of Assassination (Mosalgi), Onuju, 2013, 
 Heart of a Con Man Beats Slowly (Sagikkun ŭi simjang ŭn ch'ŏnch'ŏnhi ttwinda), RHK, 2014,  
 The Story of Rebels (Yŏkchŏkchŏn), RHK, 2014,  
 The Final Last of the Ultimate End (Choihu ŭi majimak kyŏrmal ŭi ggŭt), Opus Press, 2015, 
 140 Character Stories (Baeksasibja sosŏl), Goofic, 2016, 
 Surviving in Robot Republic (Robot gonghwaguk esŏ salanamgi), Goofic, 2016, 
 Aria of Rabbit (Tokki ŭi aria), Arzak, 2017, 
 The Case of the Creepiest Story (Gajang musŏun iyagi sagŏn), Elixir, 2017, 
 Planet Ferris Wheel (Haengsŏng daegwanramcha), Gravity Fiction, 2017,

Critical response
Jiro Hong praised him as "master of science fiction love comedy" and "master of introducing old story". However he also criticized his mystery novel, mentioning "too simple for a full-length book".

References

External links

 Blog 

South Korean science fiction writers
South Korean male writers
Year of birth missing (living people)
Living people